IRAS 00500+6713 is a type of star announced in December 2020 and created by the explosive merger of two ultra-dense white dwarfs. It consists of a super-hot central star, a super-Chandrasekhar object with a mass , surrounded by a nebula packed with hot gas and warm dust. The star represents a new kind of X-ray source. It exhibits record-breaking wind speeds and large amounts of neon, magnesium, silicon, and sulfur.  The prominence in the spectrum of highly-ionised emission lines of oxygen and the complete lack of hydrogen, helium, and nitrogen, mark it as an unusual example of a WO-type Wolf-Rayet star.

The nebula has been called Pa 30 and is classified as an unusual type of supernova remnant, likely to have been created by the merger of two white dwarfs.  The supernova even itself would have been a rare type Iax, the only one observed in the Milky Way.  It has been linked to the supernova SN 1181. The star is highly unstable, too massive to remain as a white dwarf, and it is predicted to collapse into a neutron star within ten thousand years.

References 

White dwarfs
Cassiopeia (constellation)
IRAS catalogue objects
Wolf–Rayet stars
Supernova remnants